Rhythm-al-ism is the fourth studio album by American West Coast hip hop recording artist and producer DJ Quik, released on November 24, 1998, by Arista Records and was certified Gold by the RIAA on July 7, 1999. It peaked at number 63 on the US Billboard 200 chart. He recorded the album at Skip Sailor Recordings in Los Angeles, and worked with producer G-One. The album featured the singles "You'z a Ganxta", "Hand In Hand" featuring 2nd II None & El DeBarge, and "Down, Down, Down" featuring Suga Free, Mausberg (deceased) & AMG.

Background and recording
In an interview with Complex, DJ Quik spoke on the background and recording process of Rhythm-al-ism stating, “With the Rhythm-al-ism album, even though it didn't have a home because Profile Records was going through something and I was fighting them for back royalties and they had me on suspension because they didn't want to pay me. I understood, those were some big checks, I wouldn't want to pay DJ Quik either. "I think that's when I lost my rough edges, I lost the gangster and became like an R&B pretty boy. "The name Rhythm-al-ism alone tells you what I was doing. I was mixing up rhythms. I was meshing R&B with hip-hop and jazz. And a little bit of comedy".

The cover art and some aspects of the album were inspired by L.A. rock band the Doors, confirmed by Quik himself via Instagram.

Critical response

Rhythm-al-ism received mixed reviews from contemporary music critics. People at Allmusic rated the album at 2 and a half stars and wrote that Considering its guest list—packed with enough star power (El DeBarge, Snoop Dogg, Nate Dogg, Peter Gunz, Hi-C, AMG, and 2nd II None) to fill a "Wrestlemania" card—Rhythm-al-ism promises more than it actually delivers. Its cleverest moments ("Medley for a 'V' (The Pussy Medley)") address colloquialisms for genitalia and all the wonderful things it's good for. "Down, Down, Down," "I Useta Know Her," and "No Doubt" (rhymes with: "I got something for your mouth") are plain nasty. Just what rap needs: one more guy boasting about his majestic penis and how good he is at treating women like gutter trash. Los Angeles Times gave the album 3 stars.

Commercial performance
The album debuted at number sixty three on the US Billboard 200 and spent 29 weeks on the chart. It also debuted at number thirteen on the US Top R&B/Hip-Hop Albums charts and spent 39 weeks on the chart as well. The album was certified Gold on July 27, 1999 by the RIAA for selling over 500,000 copies.

Track listing

 (co.) Co-producer

Sample credits
"We Still Party" contains samples of "Verb: That's What's Happening" by Zachary Sanders.
"Speed" contains samples of "Mom" by Earth, Wind & Fire, "Rapper Dapper Snapper" by Edwin Birdsong and "You and Love Are the Same" by The Grassroots.
"Whateva U Do" contains a sample of "So In Love" by Smokey Robinson.
"I Useta Know Her" contains a sample of "Flash Light (Extended)" by Parliament.
"Down, Down, Down" contains a sample of "So Fine" by Howard Johnson.
"You'z a Ganxta" contains a sample of "Rapper's Delight" by Sugarhill Gang.
"Get 2Getha Again" contains a sample of "Do It, Fluid" by The Blackbyrds.

Personnel
Credits for Rhythm-al-ism adapted from liner notes.

 2nd II None – composer, performer, primary artist
 AMG – composer, performer, primary artist
 Del Atkins – bass
 Robert Bacon – guitar
 Agnes Baddoo – stylist
 Kenneth Crouch – fender rhodes, piano
 El DeBarge – composer, guest artist, performer, primary artist
 Dee – background vocals
 DJ Quik – bass, composer, drums, executive producer, mixing, percussion, primary artist, producer, synthesizer
 Sheppard Lane – executive producer
 Nate Dogg – composer, guest artist
 Charles Green – horn
 Bernie Grundman – mastering
 Peter Gunz – composer, guest artist, performer, primary artist
 Playa Hamm – guest artist, performer, primary artist

 Anthony Harrison, Jr. – art direction
 Hi-C – composer, guest artist, performer, primary artist
 Stan Jones – guitar
 Dionne Knighton – background vocals
 Mausberg – guest artist, primary artist
 Eric McCaine – percussion
 Chris Puram – assistant engineer
 Snoop Dogg – composer, guest artist, performer, primary artist
 Suga Free – composer, guest artist, performer, primary artist
 Ron Townsend – flute
 Marvin Watkins – guitar
 Maurice White – composer
 Verdine White – composer
 Michael Wong – photography

Charts

Year-end charts

Singles

Certifications

Release history

References

1998 albums
DJ Quik albums
Profile Records albums
Albums produced by DJ Quik
Albums produced by G-One